Trio 99 → 00 is an album by Pat Metheny recorded with Larry Grenadier on bass and Bill Stewart on drums and released in 2000. (The album title is often listed as "Trio 99 > 00" or "Trio 99>00".)

This trio came together as Metheny finished a two-year stretch of recording and touring around the world with his regular group. For his "vacation" period, Metheny decided to find a few like-minded younger players and continue once again to expand on his unique vision of what a guitar-led, improvisationally-driven, three-piece ensemble could suggest within this modern culture of music.

During recording, the trio "spent just a couple of days together in the studio, just for a few hours a day, just playing", according to Metheny. They did not even listen back to anything until a few weeks later.

Metheny won the 2000 Grammy Award for Best Jazz Instrumental Solo for "(Go) Get It."

Track listing

Personnel
 Pat Metheny – electric and acoustic guitars
 Larry Grenadier – double bass
 Bill Stewart – drums

Awards
Grammy Awards

References
 Source - Album cover and liner notes.

2000 albums
Pat Metheny albums
Warner Records albums